Elizabeth Salamatu Forgor is a Ghanaian diplomat and a member of the New Patriotic Party of Ghana. She is currently Ghana's ambassador to Namibia.

Ambassadorial appointment 
In July 2017, President Nana Akuffo-Addo named Elizabeth Forgor as Ghana's ambassador to Namibia. She was among twenty two other distinguished Ghanaians who were named to head various diplomatic Ghanaian missions in the world.

References

Living people
High Commissioners of Ghana to Namibia
Year of birth missing (living people)
Ghanaian women ambassadors
Ghanaian diplomats
New Patriotic Party politicians
21st-century Ghanaian women